Ophionea is a genus of beetles in the family Carabidae. Like others in the family, they are predatory. The genus is mainly found in tropical Asia.

The genus includes the following species:

 Ophionea australica Baehr, 1996 
 Ophionea bakeri Dupuis, 1913
 Ophionea bhamoensis Bates, 1892
 Ophionea brandti Baehr, 1996 
 Ophionea celebensis Baehr, 1996 
 Ophionea ceylonica Baehr, 1996 
 Ophionea foersteri Bouchard, 1903
 Ophionea gestroi Maindron, 1910
 Ophionea hoashii Habu, 1962
 Ophionea indica (Thunberg, 1784)
 Ophionea insignis (Baehr, 1997)
 Ophionea interstitialis Schmidt-Gobel, 1846
 Ophionea ishiii Habu, 1961
 Ophionea leytensis Baehr, 1996 
 Ophionea malickyi Baehr, 1996 
 Ophionea micronota Andrewes, 1937
 Ophionea nigrofasciata Schmidt-Gobel, 1846
 Ophionea puncticollis Sloane, 1923
 Ophionea storeyi Baehr, 1996 
 Ophionea thouzeti Castelnau, 1867

References

Lebiinae